KMPH (840 AM) is a radio station licensed to and serving the Modesto, California area. The station is owned by Relevant Radio, Inc.

History
KMPH signed on in July 2006 with an Adult Standards/MOR format, with some talk programming.  It effectively replaced sister station KTRB, which had operated from Modesto since 1933, but had just signed off the previous month in preparation of a move to the San Francisco Bay Area.  The station switched to an all-talk format on March 10, 2008.

Pappas Telecasting shut KMPH down on August 31, 2010, due to lack of revenue.

KMPH later returned to air with brokered programming provided by Paulino Bernal Evangelism of Texas, then temporarily switched to a Talk format in May 2013 fed via KOMY (1340 AM) in La Selva Beach, California. On July 1, 2013, KMPH switched to a 1950s/1960s "Graffiti Gold" Oldies format, re-launching as "Modesto's Power House" and drawing on Modesto's connection to hometown hero George Lucas's classic 1973 motion picture, American Graffiti.

On July 30, 2014, Immaculate Heart Radio Catholic programming began airing on KMPH. IHR's purchase of the station was consummated on October 30, 2014, at a price of $50,000. KMPH flipped to the Relevant Radio branding when IHR Educational Broadcasting and Starboard Media Foundation consummated their merger on June 30, 2017.

References

External links
Relevant Radio website

Mass media in Stanislaus County, California
Relevant Radio stations
Radio stations established in 2006
2006 establishments in California
MPH